Erica Chenoweth (born April 22, 1980) is an American political scientist, professor of public policy at the Harvard Kennedy School and the Radcliffe Institute for Advanced Study. They are known for their research work on non-violent civil resistance movements.

Education 

Erica Chenoweth received their B.A. at the University of Dayton, followed by an M.A. and a Ph.D. from the University of Colorado. They previously taught at Wesleyan University until 2012 and completed postdoctoral fellowships at Harvard University and the University of Maryland. Chenoweth joined the University of Denver faculty in 2012, and the Harvard faculty in 2018.

Career 

Between 2012 and 2018, Erica Chenoweth was professor at the University of Denver. They were a faculty member and PhD program co-director at the Josef Korbel School of International Studies. They also directed the university's Program on Terrorism and Insurgency Research. They were also a researcher at the Peace Research Institute Oslo (PRIO).

Since 2018, they have been a professor of public policy at the Harvard Kennedy School and the Radcliffe Institute for Advanced Study of Harvard University.

Work 

Together with Maria J. Stephan, who was then at the U.S. Department of State, Chenoweth co-wrote the book Why Civil Resistance Works. Chenoweth and Stephan organized an international team of scholars in identifying all the major violent and nonviolent governmental change efforts of the twentieth century. They translated the results into a theory of civil resistance and its success rate for political change compared to violent resistance.

Their team compared over 200 violent revolutions and over 100 nonviolent campaigns. Their data shows that 26% of the violent revolutions were successful, while 53% of the nonviolent campaigns succeeded. Moreover, looking at change in democracy (Polity IV scores) suggest that nonviolence promotes democracy while violence promotes tyranny.

In the research data set, every campaign that got active participation from at least 3.5 percent of the population succeeded, and many succeeded with less. All the campaigns that achieved that threshold were nonviolent; no violent campaign achieved that threshold.

Their research work on non-violent civil resistance inspired the movement Extinction Rebellion.

Awards 

In 2012, Why Civil Resistance Works won the American Political Science Association's Woodrow Wilson Foundation Award for "the best book published in the U.S. during the previous calendar year on government, politics, or international affairs."

Chenoweth, along with Stephan, also won the 2013 University of Louisville Grawemeyer Award for Ideas for Improving the World Order. Past winners of this award include Mikhail Gorbachev and Robert Keohane.

In December 2013, Foreign Policy named Chenoweth one of the Top 100 Global Thinkers of the year "for proving Gandhi right," noting their work on providing evidence for the efficacy of nonviolent political movements. In 2013, Erica also won the Karl Deutsch Award (International Relations) for being "judged to have made the most significant contribution to the study of International Relations and Peace Research by the means of publication."

Chenoweth was also awarded the International Studies Association award for "Best Group Blog of the Year". It was awarded the blog "Violence @ a Glance", which they founded with Barbara F. Walter.

Bibliography
 Civil Resistance: What Everyone Needs to Know. N.Y.: Oxford University Press, 2021.
 Rethinking Violence: States and Non-State Actors in Conflict'' (2010)
 . 
Ukrainian translation:
 .

References

External links
 Faculty page, Harvard University
 Personal website

American women political scientists
American political scientists
International relations scholars
Josef Korbel School of International Studies people
1980 births
Living people
University of Denver faculty
Wesleyan University faculty
Nonviolence
American women academics
21st-century American women
21st-century American academics